Muškatirović is a Serbian surname, derived from the word musketeer. It may refer to:

Jovan Muškatirović (1743-1809), Habsburg Serbian writer
Milan Muškatirović (1934-1993), Yugoslav water polo goalkeeper
Srđan Muškatirović (b. 1972), Serbian former tennis player

Serbian surnames
Occupational surnames